Jacob Knaani (Kishenev, 1894-Jerusalem, 1978) was a Bessarabia born, later Israeli, lexicographer.

He is not to be confused with another Hebrew lexicographer, Judah Even Shemuel, who also had the German-Yiddish surname Kaufmann, and whose English-Hebrew dictionary was known as the Kaufmann Dictionary.

References

1894 births
1978 deaths
Writers from Chișinău
People from Kishinyovsky Uyezd
Moldovan Jews
Jews in Mandatory Palestine
Israeli people of Moldovan-Jewish descent
Israeli lexicographers
20th-century lexicographers
Romanian emigrants to Mandatory Palestine
Jewish lexicographers